Anomoeotes phaeomera is a species of moth of the Anomoeotidae family. It is known from Angola and Cameroon.

References

Anomoeotidae
Insects of Cameroon
Insects of Angola
Moths of Africa
Moths described in 1920